Hara and Andreas Konstantinou represented Cyprus in the Eurovision Song Contest 1997 with the song "Mana mou". Cyprus Broadcasting Corporation (CyBC) chose to host a national final to select their entry.

Before Eurovision

National final 
The final was held on 18 February 1997 at the Monte Caputo Nightclub in Limassol, hosted by Marina Maleni-Kyriazi. The winner was chosen by a 21-member jury.

At Eurovision 
Heading into the final of the contest, RTÉ reported that bookmakers ranked the entry 21st out of the 25 entries. Hara & Andreas opened the contest performing 1st, preceding Turkey. At the end of voting, they received 98 points, placing 5th of 25 competing countries, which was at the time joint-best Cypriot placing at the contest, sharing with 1982 Cypriot entry "Mono i agapi" by Anna Vissi, and would remain so until 2018.

The Cypriot jury awarded its 12 points to Greece.

Voting

References

External links
 CYPRIOT NATIONAL FINAL 1997

1997
Countries in the Eurovision Song Contest 1997
Eurovision